Joseph Dalry "Swede" Alexander (May 15, 1899 – June 16, 1962) was the head coach of the Lincoln Memorial University (1930–1931) and East Carolina University (1937–1938) college football programs.

Head coaching record

Football

References

External links
 

1899 births
1962 deaths
East Carolina Pirates football coaches
East Carolina Pirates men's basketball coaches
Lincoln Memorial Railsplitters football coaches
Lincoln Memorial Railsplitters men's basketball coaches